Komsomolsky District is the name of several administrative and municipal districts in Russia. The districts are generally named for the Komsomol—the youth wing of the Communist Party of the Soviet Union.

Districts of the federal subjects
Komsomolsky District, Chuvash Republic, an administrative and municipal district of the Chuvash Republic
Komsomolsky District, Ivanovo Oblast, an administrative and municipal district of Ivanovo Oblast
Komsomolsky District, Khabarovsk Krai, an administrative and municipal district of Khabarovsk Krai

City divisions
Komsomolsky City District, a city district of Tolyatti, a city in Samara Oblast

See also
Komsomolsky (disambiguation)
Komsomolsk (disambiguation)
Komsomol (disambiguation)

References